Shchuchye is a rural locality (a selo) and the administrative center of Shchuchinskoye Rural Settlement, Ertilsky District, Voronezh Oblast, Russia. The population was 1,306 as of 2010. There are 10 streets.

Geography 
Shchuchye is located on the right bank of the Bityug River, 27 km WSW of Ertil (the district's administrative centre) by road. Shchuchinskiye Peski is the nearest rural locality.

References 

Rural localities in Ertilsky District